Kim Ji-woon (born Kim Bong-rae, 2 July 1990) is a South Korean footballer who plays as a defender for Gyeongnam FC.

Career
He joined Jeju United from Myongji University on 7 December 2012. He changed his name from Kim Bong-rae to Kim Ji-woon in 2019.

References

External links 

1990 births
Living people
Association football defenders
South Korean footballers
Jeju United FC players
Seoul E-Land FC players
Suwon FC players
Asan Mugunghwa FC players
Daejeon Korail FC players
Gyeongnam FC players
K League 1 players
K League 2 players
K3 League players
Myongji University alumni